Jules Charles Toussaint Védrines (29 December 1881 – 21 April 1919) was an early French aviator, notable for being the first pilot to fly at more than 100 mph and for winning the Gordon Bennett Trophy race in 1912.

Biography
Jules Védrines was born in Saint-Denis, an industrial suburb of Paris, on 21 December 1881.

He was raised in the tough back alleys of Paris, shaping his rough and foul-mouthed nature which nevertheless made him a favorite of the French public. He was apprenticed to the Gnome engine manufacturing company, after which he spent six months in England as Robert Loraine's mechanic in 1910, and then returned to France, where he gained his pilot's license (no. 312) on 7 December 1910 at the Blériot school at Pau. His rise to become one of the most prominent pilots of the time started when he won the 1911 Paris to Madrid air race in May 1911 flying a Morane-Borel monoplane, although the previous month he had attracted attention by dropping bouquets of violets onto the Mi-carême procession as it entered the Place de la Concorde in Paris. That year he also came second in the Circuit of Britain race and third in the Circuit of Europe race.

Vedrines was politically active and in 1912 he stood unsuccessfully as a Socialist candidate for the Chamber of Deputies for the constituency of Limoux. He also made an early use of an aircraft for propaganda purposes, dropping leaflets demanding more aircraft for the French Army over the Chamber of Deputies in Paris in January 1912.

In 1913 he flew from Paris to Cairo in a Blériot monoplane. The flight was attended by controversy at both its beginning and its end.

On arrival at Nancy he was prevented from proceeding, since it was rightly thought that it was his intention to violate German airspace. This was a controversial issue at the time: aviators were pressing for the freedom to fly anywhere without regard to national boundaries. Védrines' action helped to bring about a conference on the matter which was held the following year. 
After a long delay in Nancy, on 20 November Védrines circumvented the ban by the transparent ruse of heading west on taking off from Nancy, changing course for Prague when out of sight of the airfield. He was tried in absentia for this by the Germans and sentenced to a year's imprisonment. After Prague he proceeded via Sofia, Constantinople (where he pleased the Sultan by dropping a Turkish flag on the Imperial palace), reaching Beirut on 25 December, Jaffa on the 27th, and finally, on the 29th, landing on the polo ground at Heliopolis, where he was greeted by a representative of the Khedive and by the French Agent, who placed a laurel wreath bound with a tricolour around his neck. Shortly after his arrival, however, he became involved in a dispute with Henri Roux, who had been a passenger in a rival attempt to fly to Cairo.  A refusal to retract an accusation of unpatriotic behaviour led to Védrines being challenged to a duel: he refused to fight, saying he was not brave enough.  An attempt by René Quinton, president of the French Ligue Aérienne, to resolve the matter by asking Védrines to fight or leave Cairo merely resulted in Védrines returning to Paris and challenging Quinton to a duel in Roux's place, Vedrines desiring to fight with French Army revolvers at ten paces. The affair made headlines in the Parisian press for several weeks, but experts in duelling protocol eventually decided that there was no cause for attempted bloodshed.

During the First World War he was largely involved in clandestine missions, landing behind enemy lines to drop or pick up agents. His Blériot XXXVIbis aircraft was named La Vache (The Cow) and was emblazoned with a picture of a cow, in homage to his family's roots in the Limousin region.  On 15 July 1915 he was mentioned in the French Army Order of the Day for his work with the Sixth Army, for whom he had flown over 1,000 hours on reconnaissance missions.

His feat was considered a success despite a hard landing which seriously damaged the aircraft and injured Védrines. After his death a stone commemorating the achievement was placed there.

Three months later, on 21 April 1919, he was killed when attempting to fly a Caudron C.23 from Villacoublay to Rome, Italy. After an engine failed he attempted a forced landing, but crashed near St Rambert d'Albon near Lyon killing himself and his mechanic, Marcel Guillain.

Notes

External links
 

1881 births
1919 deaths
French aviators
People from Saint-Denis, Seine-Saint-Denis
French World War I pilots